Shane Leahy (born 27 November 1971) is an Irish former rugby union player.

Career
Leahy attended Crescent College in Limerick and won Munster Schools Rugby Senior Cup titles in 1989 and 1990. His father, Mick, earned one cap for Ireland against Wales during the 1964 Five Nations Championship, whilst older brother Kelvin also earned a single cap for Ireland against New Zealand in 1992, and brothers Shane and Ross also won Munster Schools Rugby Senior Cup titles with Crescent College.

He played for Dublin club Lansdowne in the All-Ireland League, but work took Leahy back to Limerick, where he joined Garryowen. He played for Ireland A against South Africa A in November 1996, and made five appearances for Connacht during the 1996–97 Challenge Cup, before joining Munster ahead of the 1997–98 season and making 17 appearances for the province between 1997 and 1999. After rugby, Leahy became CEO of Oxygen8.

References

External links
Munster Profile

Shane Leahy at LinkedIn

Living people
1971 births
Irish rugby union players
Lansdowne Football Club players
Garryowen Football Club players
Connacht Rugby players
Munster Rugby players
Ireland Wolfhounds international rugby union players
Rugby union locks